Patti McLeod is a Canadian politician, who was elected to in the Yukon Legislative Assembly in the 2011 election. She represents the electoral district of Watson Lake as a member of the Yukon Party caucus.

Political career

33rd Legislative Assembly

She was first elected as MLA of Watson Lake on October 11, 2011, succeeding former Yukon Premier Dennis Fentie.

During her first term in office, she served as Deputy Speaker and Chair of Committee of the Whole, as well as the Chair of the Select Committee on Whistle-blower Protection, the Select Committee Regarding the Risks and Benefits of Hydraulic Fracturing, and the Standing Committee on Elections and Privileges. Additionally, she was appointed to the Standing Committee on Appointments to Major Government Boards and Committees, the Standing Committee on Rules, the Standing Committee on Public Accounts, and the Standing Committee on Statutory Instruments.

On May 10, 2016, McLeod was elected as the 11th Speaker of the Yukon Legislative Assembly, following the resignation of incumbent Speaker David Laxton. Upon her election as Speaker, Ms. McLeod became Chair of the Members’ Services Board.

She is the first female Speaker of the Yukon Legislative Assembly and served in that capacity until January 2017.

34th Legislative Assembly

McLeod was re-elected as MLA of Watson Lake on November 7, 2016, when the Yukon Party was defeated by the Yukon Liberal Party. She is currently the Official Opposition critic for the Department of Health and Social Services, the Women's Directorate, and the Yukon Workers’ Compensation Health and Safety Board. McLeod is currently also a member of the Standing Committee on Statutory Instruments and the Standing Committee on Appointments to Major Government Boards and Committees.

Personal life

Prior to entering territorial politics, she worked in mining administration for the federal and territorial governments. She is a former elected member of the Watson Lake town council and used to work for the Watson Lake Chamber of Commerce.

Electoral record

2016 general election

|-

| NDP
| Erin Labonte
| align="right"| 219
| align="right"| 28.5%
| align="right"| -4.6%

| Liberal
| Ernie Jamieson
| align="right"| 212
| align="right"| 27.6%
| align="right"| +5.0%

| Independent
| Victor Kisoun
| align="right"| 38
| align="right"| 5.0%
| align="right"| -1.6%
|-
! align=left colspan=3|Total
! align=right| 768
! align=right| 100.0%
! align=right| –
|}

2011 general election

|-

| NDP
| Liard McMillan
| align="right"| 242
| align="right"| 33.1%
| align="right"| +27.3%

| Liberal
| Thomas Slager
| align="right"| 165
| align="right"| 22.6%
| align="right"| -3.0%

| Independent
| Patricia Gilhooly
| align="right"| 48
| align="right"| 6.6%
| align="right"| +6.6%

|-
! align=left colspan=3|Total
! align=right| 731
! align=right| 100.0%
! align=right| –
|}

References

Yukon Party MLAs
Women MLAs in Yukon
Living people
Speakers of the Yukon Legislative Assembly
21st-century Canadian politicians
21st-century Canadian women politicians
Women legislative speakers
Year of birth missing (living people)